The Adai (also Adaizan, Adaizi, Adaise, Adahi, Adaes, Adees, Atayos) were a Native American people of northwestern Louisiana and northeastern Texas with a Southeastern culture. The name Adai is derived from the Caddo word hadai meaning 'brushwood'.

The Adai were among the first peoples in North America to experience European contact and were profoundly affected. In 1530, Álvar Núñez Cabeza de Vaca wrote of them using the name Atayos. The Adai subsequently moved away from their homeland. By 1820, there were only 30 persons remaining. Their extinct language was possibly Caddoan, but Adai remains unclassified because of a lack of attestation.

References

Caddoan peoples
Native American history of Louisiana
Native American tribes in Louisiana
Native American tribes in Texas